Turcosuchus is an extinct genus of basal eusuchian crocodyliform known from the Early Cretaceous İncigez Formation in Turkey. It contains a single species, T. okani.

References 

Neosuchians
Prehistoric crocodylomorphs
Cretaceous reptiles of Asia
Reptiles described in 2019
Fossil taxa described in 2019